Guo Moruo (November 16, 1892 – June 12, 1978), courtesy name Dingtang, was a Chinese author, poet, historian, archaeologist, and government official.

Biography

Family history

At the time of Guo's birth, Shawan was a town of some 180 families.

Guo's father's ancestors were Hakkas from Ninghua County in Tingzhou fu, near the western border of Fujian. They moved to Sichuan in the second half of the 17th century, after Sichuan had lost much of its population to the rebels/bandits of Zhang Xianzhong ( 1605–1647). According to family legend, the only possessions that Guo's ancestors brought to Sichuan were things they could carry on their backs. Guo's great-grandfather, Guo Xianlin, was the first in the family to achieve a degree of prosperity. Guo Xianlin's sons established the Guo clan as the leaders of the local river shipping business, and thus important people in that entire region of Sichuan. It was only then that the Guo clan members became able to send their children to school.

Guo's father, one of whose names may possibly have been Guo Mingxing (1854–1939), had to drop out of school at the age of 13 and then spent six months as an apprentice at a salt well. Thereafter he entered his father's business, a shrewd and smart man who achieved some local renown as a Chinese medical doctor, traded successfully in oils, opium, liquor, and grain and operated a money changing business. His business success allowed him to increase the family's real estate and salt well holdings.

Guo's mother, in contrast, came from a scholar-official background. She was a daughter of Du Zhouzhang, a holder of the coveted jinshi degree. Whilst serving as an acting magistrate in Huangping prefecture, now part of Qiandongnan Miao and Dong Autonomous Prefecture, in eastern Guizhou, Du died in 1858 while fighting Miao rebels, when his daughter (the future mother of Guo Moruo) was less than a year old. She married into the Guo family in 1872, when she was fourteen.

Childhood
Guo was the eighth child of his mother. Three of his siblings had died before he was born, but more children were born later, so by the time he went to school, he had seven siblings.

Guo also had the childhood name Guo Wenbao ("Cultivated Leopard"), given due to a dream his mother had on the night he was conceived.

A few years before Guo was born, his parents retained a private tutor, Shen Huanzhang, to provide education for their children, in the hope of them later passing civil service examinations. A precocious child, Guo started studying at this "family school" in the spring of 1897, at the early age of four and a half. Initially, his studies were based on Chinese classics, but with the government education reforms of 1901, mathematics and other modern subjects started to be introduced.

When in the fall of 1903 a number of public schools were established in Sichuan's capital, Chengdu, the Guo children started going there to study. Guo's oldest brother, Guo Kaiwen (1877–1936), entered one of them, Dongwen Xuetang, a secondary school preparing students for study in Japan; the next oldest brother, Guo Kaizou, joined Wubei Xuetang, a military school. Guo Kaiwen soon became instrumental in exposing his brother and sisters still in Shawan to modern books and magazines that allowed them to learn about the wide world outside.

Guo Kaiwen continued to be a role model for his younger brothers when in February 1905 he left for Japan, to study law and administration at Tokyo Imperial University on a provincial government' scholarship.

After passing competitive examinations, in early 1906 Guo Moruo started attending the new upper-level primary school in Jiading. It was a boarding school located in a former Buddhist temple and the boy lived on premises. He went on to a middle school in 1907, acquiring by this time the reputation of an academically gifted student but a troublemaker. His peers respected him and often elected him a delegate to represent their interests in front of the school administration. Often spearheading student-faculty conflicts, he was expelled and reinstated a few times, and finally expelled permanently in October 1909.

Guo was glad to be expelled, as he now had a reason to go to the provincial capital Chengdu to continue his education there.

In October 1911, Guo was surprised by his mother announcing that a marriage was arranged for him. He went along with his family's wishes, marrying his appointed bride, Zhang Jinghua, sight-unseen in Shawan in March 1912. Immediately, he regretted this marriage, and five days after the marriage, he left his ancestral home and returned to Chengdu, leaving his wife behind. He never formally divorced her, but apparently never lived with her either.

Study abroad

Following his elder brothers, Guo left China in December 1913, reaching Japan in early January 1914. After a year of preparatory study in Tokyo, he entered Sixth Higher School in Okayama. When visiting a friend of his hospitalized in Saint Luke's Hospital in Tokyo, in the summer of 1916, Guo fell in love with Sato Tomiko, a Japanese woman from a Christian family, who worked at the hospital as a student nurse. Sato would become his common-law wife. They were to stay together for 20 years, until the outbreak of the war, and to have five children together.

After graduation from the Okayama school, Guo entered in 1918 the Medical School of Kyushu Imperial University in Fukuoka. He was more interested in literature than medicine, however. His studies at this time focused on foreign language and literature, namely the works of: Spinoza, Goethe, Walt Whitman, and the Nobel Laureate Rabindra Nath Tagore. Along with numerous translations, he published his first anthology of poems, entitled The Goddesses (1921). He co-founded the Creation Society in Shanghai, which promoted modern and vernacular literature.

The war years

Guo joined the Chinese Communist Party in 1927. He was involved in the Communist Nanchang Uprising and fled to Japan after its failure. He stayed there for 10 years studying Chinese ancient history. During that time he published his work on inscriptions on oracle bones and bronze vessels, Corpus of Inscriptions on Bronzes from the Two Zhou Dynasties. In this work, he attempted to demonstrate, according to the Communist doctrine, the "slave society" nature of ancient China. His theory on the "slave society of China" remains highly controversial, although it was praised by Mao Zedong and the party.

In the summer of 1937, shortly after the Marco Polo Bridge incident, Guo returned to China to join the anti-Japanese resistance. After the war, Sato went to reunite with him but was disappointed to know that he had already formed a new family.

As a communist leader

Along with holding important government offices in the People's Republic of China, Guo was a prolific writer, not just of poetry but also fiction, plays, autobiographies, translations, and historical and philosophical treatises. He was the first President of the Chinese Academy of Sciences and remained so from its founding in 1949 until his death in 1978. He was also the first president of University of Science & Technology of China (USTC), a new type of university established by the Chinese Academy of Sciences (CAS) after the founding of the People's Republic of China and aimed at fostering high-level personnel in the fields of science and technology.

For the first 15 years of the PRC, Guo, with his extensive knowledge of Chinese history and culture, was the ultimate arbiter of philosophical matters relating to art, education, and literature, although all of his most vital and important work had been written before 1949.

With the onset of the Cultural Revolution in 1966, Guo became an early target of persecution. To save face, he wrote a public self-criticism and declared that all his previous works were in error and should be burned. He then turned to writing poetry praising Mao's wife Jiang Qing and the Cultural Revolution and also denounced former friends and colleagues as counterrevolutionaries. However, this was not enough to protect his family. Two of his sons, Guo Minying and Guo Shiying, "committed suicide" in 1967 and 1968 following "criticism" or persecution by Red Guards.

Because of his sycophantic loyalty to Mao, he survived the Cultural Revolution and received commendation by the chairman at the 9th Party Congress in April 1969. By the early 1970s, he had regained most of his influence. He enjoyed all the privileges of the highest-ranking party elites, including residence in a luxurious manor house once owned by a Qing official, a staff of assigned servants, a state limousine, and other perks. Guo also maintained a large collection of antique furniture and curios in his home.

In 1978, following Mao's death and the fall of the Gang of Four, the 85 year old Guo, as he lay dying in a Beijing hospital, penned a poem denouncing the Gang.

 (What wonderful news!)
 (Rooting out the Gang of Four.)
 (The literary rogue.)
 (The political rogue.)
 (The sinister adviser.)
 (The White-Boned Demon.)
 (All swept away by the iron broom.)

The White-Boned Demon was a character in the Ming-era novel Journey to the West, an evil shapeshifting being, and was a popular derogatory nickname for Jiang Qing.

Guo was awarded the Stalin Peace Prize in 1951.

Legacy
Guo was held in high regard in Chinese contemporary literature, history and archaeology. He once called himself the Chinese answer to Goethe and this appraisal was widely accepted. Zhou Yang said: "You are Goethe, but you are the Goethe of the New Socialist Era of China."("")

Despite his achievements, he was also criticised as the first of "Four Contemporary Shameless Writers". For example, he spoke highly of Mao Zedong's calligraphy, to the extent that he justified what the Party Leader had written mistakenly. And during the Cultural Revolution, he published a book called Li Bai and Du Fu in which he praised Li Bai while belittling Du Fu, which was thought to flatter Mao Zedong. His attitude to the Gang of Four changed sharply before and after its downfall.

In his private life, he was also known to have affairs with many women, whom he abandoned shortly afterwards. One of them, Li Chen, allegedly committed suicide after his betrayal, although this is disputed.

Family

Guo had five children (four sons and a daughter) with Sato Tomiko and six with Yu Liqun (four sons and two daughters). An article published in the 2000s said that eight out of the eleven were alive, and that three have died.

With Sato Tomiko (listed chronologically in the order of birth):
son Guo Hefu (December 12 (or 31, according to other sources) 1917, Okayama - September 13, 1994). A chemist, he moved from Japan to Taiwan in 1946 and to mainland China in 1949. He was the founder of the Institute of Chemical Physics of the Chinese Academy of Sciences.
son Guo Bo (born 1920), a renowned architect and photographer. He came to China in 1955, invited by his father, and worked in Shanghai, where he participated in the design of many of its famous modern buildings. Guo Bu is also known as a photographer of Shanghai's heritage architecture; an album of his photographic work has been published as a book.
son Guo Fusheng.
daughter Guo Shuyu, a Japanese-language teacher, now deceased.
son Guo Zhihong.

With Yu Liqun (listed chronologically in the order of birth):
son Guo Hanying (born 1941, Chongqing). An internationally published theoretical physicist.
daughter Guo Shuying.  She published a book about her father.
son Guo Shiying (1942 - April 22, 1968). In 1962, while a philosophy student at Beijing University, he created an "underground" "X Poetry Society". In the summer of 1963 the society was exposed and deemed subversive. Guo Shiying was sentenced to re-education through labor. While working at a farm in Henan province, he developed interest in agriculture. Returning to Beijing in 1965, he enrolled at Beijing Agricultural University. In 1968, kidnapped by Red Guards and "tried" by their "court" for his poetry-society activity years before he jumped out of the window of the third-floor room where he was held and died at the age of 26. His father in his later writing expressed regret for encouraging his son to return to Beijing from the farm, thinking that it indirectly led to his death.
son Guo Minying, (November 1943, Chongqing - April 12, 1967). His death is described as an unexpected suicide.
daughter Guo Pingying
son Guo Jianying (born 1953).

Commemoration
Guo's residence in Beijing, near Shicha Lake (Shichahai), where he lived after the war with his second (or third, if the arranged marriage is to be counted) wife, Yu Liqun, is preserved as a museum.
Guo and Sato Tomiko's house in Ichikawa, Chiba, Japan, where they lived in 1927-37, is a museum as well. Due to the Guo Moruo connection, Ichikawa chose to establish sister city relations with Leshan in 1981.

Honours 
  Empire of Iran : Commemorative Medal of the 2500th Anniversary of the founding of the Persian Empire (14/10/1971).

Bibliography
This is a select bibliography. A fuller bibliography may be found in: A Selective Guide to Chinese Literature, 1900-1949 (Leiden: E. J. Brill, 1988-90. 4 vols.).

Poetry, stories, novels, plays
 1921: Goddess: Songs and Poems. English translation: Selected Poems from the Goddesses, A. C. Barnes and John Lester, tr., Beijing: Foreign Languages Press, 1958.
 1926, 1932: Olives, Shanghai: Chuangzao she chubanshe bu, 1929 (book series: Chuangzao she congshu)..
 1928, 1932: Fallen Leaves, Shanghai : Xin zhong guo shu ju, 1932.
 1936: Chu Yuan: Five Acts;. English translation: Chu Yuan: A Play in Five Acts, Yang Xianyi and Gladys Yang, tr., Beijing: Foreign Languages Press, 1953; 2nd edition, 1978; Honolulu: University Press of the Pacific, 2001.
 1946: "Under the Moonlight", in: The China Magazine (formerly China at War), June 1946; reprinted in: Chi-Chen Wang, ed., Stories of China at War, Columbia University Press, 1947; reprinted: Westport, Conn. : Greenwood Press, 1975.
 1947: Laughter Underground), Shanghai and Beijing: Hai yan shu dian - selected stories.
 1959: Red Flag Ballad, Beijing Shi: Hongqi zhazhi she (= Red Flag Magazine), 1959; English translation: Songs of the Red Flag, Yang Zhou, tr., Peking, Foreign Languages Press, 1961.

Autobiography
Guo wrote nine autobiographical works: 
 1947: My Youth, Shanghai.
 French translation: , tr. Pierre Ryckmans, Paris, Gallimard, 1970.
 German translation: , tr. Ingo Schäfer, Frankfurt am Main: Insel, 1981.
 Before and After the Revolution (Fanzheng qianhou).
 1930, 1931: The Black Cat and the Tower, Shanghai, 1930. - often referred to just as Black Cat.
 The First Outing of Kuimen (Chuchu Kuimen).
 My Student Years (Wode xuesheng shidai).
 1932: Ten Years of Creation, Shanghai : Xian dai shu ju, 1932. 
 1938: Sequel to Ten Years of Creation, Shanghai : Bei xin shuju. (book series: Chuangzuo xin kan).
 On the Road of the Northern Expedition (Beifa Tuci).
 洪波曲 / Hongbo qu.

Historical, educational, and philosophical treatises
 1935, rev. ed., 1957: 兩周金文辭大系圖彔攷釋 / Liang Zhou jin wen ci da xi tu lu kao shi (Corpus of Inscriptions on Bronzes from the Two Zhou [Chou] Dynasties), Beijing: Ke xue chu ban she, 1957 (考古学专刊. 甲种 = Archaeological monograph series).
 1950: "Report on Culture and Education", in: The First Year of Victory, Peking, Foreign Languages Press. 
 1951: Culture and Education in New China, Peking : Foreign Languages Press, 1951 (joint authors: Chien Chun-jui, Liu Tsun-chi, Mei Tso, Hu Yu-chih, Coching Chu and Tsai Chu-sheng).
 1982: 甲骨文合集 Jiaguwen Heji (Oracle Collection), Shanghai: Zhonghua shuju, 1978-1983, 13 volumes (edited with Hu Houxuan) - collection of 41,956 oracle bone inscriptions from Yinxu.

Other nonfiction
 Appeal and Resolutions of the First Session of the World Peace Council : Berlin ; February 21-26, 1951 ; Kuo Mo-jo's Speech at the World Peace Council, Peking: Foreign Languages Press, 1951.
 Kuo Mo-jo, "The Struggle for the Creation of New China's Literature" in: Enlai Zhou, The People's New Literature : Four Reports at the First All-China Conference of Writers and Artists, Peking: Cultural Press, 1951.

Translations
 1922: J. W. von Goethe, Die Leiden des Jungen Werther (The Sorrows of Young Werther)
 1924: Kawakami Hajime, Social Organization and Social Revolution
 1925: Ivan Turgenev, Xin shi dai (Virgin Soil)
 1926: Schiller, Wallenstein
 1928: Friedrich Nietzsche, Also sprach Zarathustra (Thus Spake Zarathustra)
 1928: J. W. von Goethe, Faust, I. Teil
 1929: Upton Sinclair, Tu chang (The Jungle)
 1931: Karl Marx, Kritik der Politischen Ökonomie (Capital: A Critique of Political Economy)
 1935: Leo Tolstoy, Voina i mir (War and Peace)

Contributions
 1974: Cho Wen-chün: A Play in Three Acts (abridged), in: Straw Sandals: Chinese Short Stories, 1918-1933, Harold R. Isaacs, ed., Cambridge, Mass.: MIT Press.

References

Further reading 
 Chen Xiaoming, From The May Fourth Movement to Communist Revolution: Guo Moruo and the Chinese Path to Communism, Albany, New York: State University of New York Press, 2007.
 Arif Dirlik, "Kuo Mo-jo and Slavery in Chinese History", in: Arif Dirlik, Revolution and History : The Origins of Marxist Historiography in China, 1919-1937, Berkeley, CA : University of California Press, 1978, pp. 137-179. Also online here (UC Press E-Books Collection, 1982-2004).
 Robert Elegant, "Confucius to Shelley to Marx: Kuo Mo-jo", in: Robert Elegant, China's Red Masters, New York: Twayne Publishers, 1951; reprinted: Westport, Connecticut: Greenwood Press, 1971
 Gudrun Fabian, "Guo Moruo: Shaonian shidai", 4 November 2020, in: Kindlers Literatur Lexikon, Living Edition (i.e. online edition), Heinz Ludwig Arnold, ed. 
 Marian Galik, The Genesis of Modern Chinese Literary Criticism (1917–1930), Routledge, 1980 - includes chapter: "Kuo Mo-jo and his Development from Aesthetico-impressionist to Proletarian Criticism"
 James Laughlin, New Directions in Prose and Poetry 19: An Anthology, New York: New Directions, 1966.
 Jean Monsterleet, Sommets de la littérature chinoise contemporaine, Paris: Editions Domat, 1953. "Includes a general overview of the literary renaissance from 1917-1950, as well as sections on Novel (with chapters on Ba Jin, Mao Dun, Lao She and Shen Congwen), Stories and Essays (with chapters on Lu Xun, Zhou Zuoren, Bing Xin, and Su Xuelin), Theater (Cao Yu, Guo Moruo), and Poetry (Xu Zhimo, Wen Yiduo, Bian Zhilin, Feng Zhi, and Ai Qing). Source: General Literary Studies 1
 Jaroslav Prusek, ed., Studies in Modern Chinese Literature, Ostasiatische Forschungen, Schriften der Sektion fur Sinologie bei der Deutschen Akademie der Wissenschaften zu Berlin, Heft 2. Berlin (East), Akademie Verlag, 1964
 David Tod Roy, Kuo Mo-jo: The Early Years, Cambridge: Mass., Harvard University Press, 1971 (Harvard East Asian series, 55)
 Shi Shumei, The Lure of the Modern : Writing Modernism in Semicolonial China, 1917-1937, Berkeley and Los Angeles, California: University of California Press, 2001, especially chapter "Psychoanalysis and Cosmopolitanism: The Work of Guo Moruo"
 Yang Guozheng, "Malraux et Guo Moruo: deux intellectuels engagés", in: Présence d'André Malraux No. 5/6, Malraux et la Chine: Actes du colloque international de Pékin 18, 19 et 20 avril 2005 (printemps 2006), pp. 163-172.

Journals
  = Journal of Guo Moruo Studies, Century Journals Project - Literature/History/Philosophy (Series F): 1987 - 1993, at ebscohost.com

External links

 Guo Moruo at Encyclopaedia Britannica
Guo Moruo newssc.org
 Guo Moruo's rare masterpiece... demonstrates extraordinary talents at inf.news
 (Photo) Kuo Mo-Jo speaking at great figures of world culture meeting, December 12, 1956 at digitalcommonwealth.org
 Kuo Mo-jo And Peiping's Power Struggle

|-

|-

1892 births
1978 deaths
Chinese archaeologists
Republic of China poets
Modern Chinese poetry
People's Republic of China poets
Republic of China historians
People's Republic of China historians
Chinese autobiographers
Chinese expatriates in Japan
Members of the National Committee of the Chinese People's Political Consultative Conference
Members of the National People's Congress
Members of Academia Sinica
Foreign Members of the Bulgarian Academy of Sciences
Presidents of the University of Science and Technology of China
Hakka writers
Politicians from Leshan
Chinese Marxists
Stalin Peace Prize recipients
University of Science and Technology of China alumni
Academic staff of the University of Science and Technology of China
Sichuan University alumni
Poets from Sichuan
People's Republic of China politicians from Sichuan
Scientists from Sichuan
Kyushu University alumni
20th-century Chinese historians
Hakka scientists
Historians from Sichuan
Educators from Sichuan
Writers from Leshan